The Glass Man and the Golden Bird: Hungarian Folk and Fairy Tales is a 1968 anthology of 21 tales from Hungary that have been collected and retold by Ruth Manning-Sanders. It is one in a long series of such anthologies by Manning-Sanders.

Table of contents
The Wonderful Tree
The Seven Simons
The Ram with the Golden Fleece
The Nine Peahens and the Golden Apples
Little Firenko
The Secret-Keeping Boy
The Witch and the Swan Maiden
A Handful of Hay
The Cock and the Hen
The Spotted Cow
Uletka
Dummling
The Glass Man and the Golden Bird
The Fiddle
Prince Mirko
The Fairy Helena
The Three Lemons
The Adventures of Pengo
1. Pengo and the Giants
2. Pengo and the Span High Man
Gisella and the Goat
Kate Contrary
The Lost Children

Collections of fairy tales
Children's short story collections
1968 short story collections
Hungarian fairy tales
1968 children's books
1968 anthologies